Brickhill is a civil parish and suburb in the northern part of the town of Bedford in Bedfordshire, England.

Brickhill or Brick Hill may also refer to:

Places
 Bow Brickhill, Buckinghamshire
 Great Brickhill, Buckinghamshire
 Little Brickhill, Buckinghamshire
 Brick Hill (Baltimore, Maryland)
 Brick Hill, an alternative name for Nam Long Shan, Hong Kong

People
 David Brickhill-Jones (born 1981), British orienteer
 Joan Brickhill (1924–2014), South African actress
 Paul Brickhill (1916–1991), Australian World War II fighter pilot, PoW and author

See also
 Brinkhill